Aki Tammisto (1 March 1915 – 23 March 1978) was a Finnish sprinter. He competed in the men's 200 metres at the 1936 Summer Olympics.

References

External links

1915 births
1978 deaths
Athletes (track and field) at the 1936 Summer Olympics
Finnish male sprinters
Olympic athletes of Finland